Martin Hoban House is a historic home located at South Bend, St. Joseph County, Indiana. It was built in 1896, and is a -story, irregular plan, Queen Anne style brick dwelling.  It has a cross-gable roof and sits on a granite and limestone foundation.  It features a two-story projecting bay, round arched windows, and a one-story hip roofed front porch supported by Tuscan order columns.

It was listed on the National Register of Historic Places in 1999.

References

Houses on the National Register of Historic Places in Indiana
Queen Anne architecture in Indiana
Houses completed in 1896
Buildings and structures in South Bend, Indiana
Houses in St. Joseph County, Indiana
National Register of Historic Places in St. Joseph County, Indiana